is a former Japanese football player.

Playing career
Sato was born in Kitamoto on November 2, 1977. After graduating from high school, he joined J1 League club Nagoya Grampus Eight in 1996. However he could not play at all in the match until 1997. In 1998, he moved to Vissel Kobe. Although he played several matches as offensive midfielder, he could not play many matches. In 2000, he moved to J2 League club Omiya Ardija based in his local Saitama Prefecture. In 2001, he moved to Montedio Yamagata. He became a regular player and he played many matches in 2 seasons. In 2003, he moved to Cerezo Osaka. In 2005, he moved to Shonan Bellmare. He was converted to defensive midfielder by manager Eiji Ueda and he played as regular player in 2 seasons. In 2007, he moved to Tokyo Verdy. Although the club won the 2nd place and was promoted to J1, he could not become a regular player. In 2008, he moved to Japan Football League club Tochigi SC. He played in all matches as captain and the club was promoted to J2 from 2009 season. However his opportunity to play decreased for injury from 2009 season and he retired end of 2010 season.

Club statistics

References

External links

1977 births
Living people
Association football people from Saitama Prefecture
Japanese footballers
J1 League players
J2 League players
Japan Football League players
Nagoya Grampus players
Vissel Kobe players
Omiya Ardija players
Montedio Yamagata players
Cerezo Osaka players
Shonan Bellmare players
Tokyo Verdy players
Tochigi SC players
Association football midfielders